Rutherford Intermodal Yard is a large rail yard located in Swatara Township, Dauphin County, just east of Harrisburg, Pennsylvania.

History

The yard was formerly operated by the Reading Railroad and later Conrail. Ownership was transferred from Conrail to the Norfolk Southern Railway in 1999. In the summer of 2000, Norfolk Southern retrofitted the yard for $31 million, its first major investment in the Harrisburg area. Large cargo containers are transferred at the yard from flatbed truck trailers to flatbed rail cars, or vice versa. The Rutherford facility has 10 classification tracks, two loading/unloading tracks, two overhead cranes, and parking space for 600 trailers.

See also
 Harrisburg Line

References

External links
 Norfolk Southern Railway facilities

Conrail
Norfolk Southern Railway
Reading Company
Rail yards in Pennsylvania
Transportation buildings and structures in Dauphin County, Pennsylvania